The Wraith is a live television comedy play presented on Australian television in 1957. Broadcast on ABC, it was originally telecast in Sydney, and shown in Melbourne via a kinescope recording. It was made at a time when Australian drama was rare.

Duration was 30 minutes, in black and white. It was written by W. Graeme-Holder, and had previously been presented on radio during the 1930s. It is not known if the kinescope recording of the television version is still extant.

Premise
"The Wraith" is the name of a mysterious burglar.

Two gentlemen, John and James, are burgling the London flat of Madeleine Bloom, a wealthy actor. They are interrupted by a lady who accuses them of trespass.

Cast
Leonard Bullen - John
Normal Cull - James
Joan Lord - Lady

Production
The play was based on a 1936 radio play that was often performed in the late 1930s. It had been performed on the BBC radio in 1939.

Joan Lord had been in earlier TV plays Twelve Pound Look and Elizabeth Refuses.

See also
List of live television plays broadcast on Australian Broadcasting Corporation (1950s)
Take That - First Australian television sitcom.

References

External links
 The Wraith at IMDb
The Wraith at AustLit
1936 radio play at AustLit
W Graeme-Holder at AustLit

1950s Australian television plays
1957 television plays
Australian Broadcasting Corporation original programming
English-language television shows
Black-and-white Australian television shows
Australian live television shows